Colipase, abbreviated CLPS, is a protein co-enzyme required for optimal enzyme activity of pancreatic lipase.   It is secreted by the pancreas in an inactive form, procolipase, which is activated in the intestinal lumen by trypsin. Its function is to prevent the inhibitory effect of bile salts on the lipase-catalyzed intraduodenal hydrolysis of dietary long-chain triglycerides.

In humans, the colipase protein is encoded by the CLPS gene.

Protein domain 

Colipase is also a family of evolutionarily related proteins.

Colipase is a small protein cofactor needed by pancreatic lipase for efficient dietary lipid hydrolysis. Efficient absorption of dietary fats is dependent on the action of pancreatic triglyceride lipase. Colipase binds to the C-terminal, non-catalytic domain of lipase, thereby stabilising an active conformation and considerably increasing the hydrophobicity of its binding site. Structural studies of the complex and of colipase alone have revealed the functionality of its architecture.

Colipase is a small protein (12K) with five conserved disulphide bonds. Structural analogies have been recognised between a developmental protein (Dickkopf), the pancreatic lipase C-terminal domain, the N-terminal domains of lipoxygenases and the C-terminal domain of alpha-toxin. These non-catalytic domains in the latter enzymes are important for interaction with membrane. It has not been established if these domains are also involved in eventual protein cofactor binding as is the case for pancreatic lipase.

See also
 Enterostatin

References

Further reading

External links
 
 PDBe-KB provides an overview of all the structure information available in the PDB for Pig Colipase 

Protein domains
Membrane proteins
Enzymes
Protein families